

This is a timeline of events related to the Colombia-Nicaragua relations.

This timeline is incomplete; some important events may be missing. Please help add to it.

1920

The 82nd parallel north must be close to the North Pole. Correct is 82nd Meridian West.

1930s

1940s

1980s

1990s

2000s

References

External links
 terra.com.co: ICJ opens the way for a resolution of the Nicaragua-Colombia dispute

Colombia–Nicaragua relations
Political timelines